Hawker Siddeley Switchgear is a British manufacturer of electrical switchgear and overhead line equipment, the company operates a wholly owned subsidiary in Australia.

Based in the United Kingdom and are owned by Melrose plc.

History
In 1957, Hawker Siddeley group acquired the Brush Group, and in 1973 Brush Switchgear acquired Bowthorpe's power equipment division, with factories at Bridgend and Banbury. In 1991 South Wales Switchgear merged with Brush Switchgear to form Hawker Siddeley Switchgear Limited..

The company was bought by FKI in 1996 becoming part of FKI Switchgear; a division also including the company Whipp & Bourne since 1986.

In 2008 Melrose plc acquired FKI along with its Switchgear group, following which FKI Switchgear once again became Hawker Siddeley Switchgear.

As of 2009 Melrose has incorporated four electrical switchgear manufacturers:
Hawker Siddeley Switchgear Ltd - formed in 1991 from South Wales Switchgear and Brush Switchgear
South Wales Switchgear - (founded 1941) - instrumental in developing SF6 gas insulated switchgear.
Brush Switchgear - (Brush Electrical Engineering company founded 1888) - pioneers of vacuum switchgear.
Hawker Siddeley Switchgear Pty Ltd in Australia (HSSA) - (in operation since 1964) - subsidiary of Hawker Siddeley Switchgear.
Whipp & Bourne - (established in 1903 by Samuel Whipp and Charles Bourne).

Products
The company's products include overhead electrical line and other outdoor switchgear for voltages up to 38 kV, indoor switchgear for voltages to 15 kV, containerised electrical substations, HV DC switchgear for currents up to 12 kA with voltages up to 1.8 kV and protection relays, as well as servicing, maintenance and repair services.

The company has supplied equipment for the Channel Tunnel rail link, the Metro-North Railroad and the Dubai Metro program amongst others.

References

External links

 Australian subsidiary
Melrose PLC website

Companies based in Loughborough
Electrical engineering companies of the United Kingdom
Manufacturing companies of Australia
Manufacturing companies of the United Kingdom